David "Dave" P. Del Dotto is a former real estate investor from Modesto, California, who sold a course called the "Cash Flow System" through infomercials on late-night television in the 1980s and early 1990s. In addition to his Cash Flow System course, Del Dotto also wrote a book, How to Make Nothing but Money, which is no longer in print.

Infomercial career 

Del Dotto often shot his infomercials from locations in Hawaii with his students. As a self-proclaimed expert, he would give advice on real estate investment. Del Dotto had associates sell his book and tape programs to audiences throughout the United States and Canada. Those who bought the course would be invited to a weekend seminar. At the weekend events several additional speakers would sell their financial educational material, which usually included books and audio and video courses.

Legal trouble
On October 22, 1993, the Los Angeles Times reported:

In February 1995, the FTC filed suit against Del Dotto. In 1996, Del Dotto settled for $200,000 charges that he and his companies had made "allegedly deceptive claims" in marketing his books and audio tapes on real estate investment.

Pop Culture
A clip of one of his videos was featured in the movie Houseguest, as well as Mississippi Masala.

Current career
Since 1993, Del Dotto has been producing wine at Del Dotto Vineyards in Napa, California.

See also
List of celebrities who own wineries and vineyards

References

External links
 Del Dotto Vineyards
 Video of Del Dotto giving a vineyard tour

Living people
American investors
American real estate businesspeople
American winemakers
American fraudsters
People from Napa, California
Year of birth missing (living people)